The name Lorena has been used for five tropical cyclones in the Eastern Pacific Ocean.
 Hurricane Lorena (1983)
 Hurricane Lorena (1989)
 Tropical Storm Lorena (2001)
 Tropical Storm Lorena (2013)
 Hurricane Lorena (2019), which was a Category 1 hurricane that made landfall in Baja California.

Pacific hurricane set index articles